Arent Berntsen (12 May 1610 in Bergen – 29 December 1680 in Copenhagen; also spelled Arennt Berntsen) was a Dano-Norwegian topographical-statistical author, businessman, banker, estate owner and councillor in Copenhagen. He is most widely known for his monumental 1656 work Danmarckis oc Norgis Fructbar Herlighed, one of the primary sources of information relating to Denmark-Norway in the 17th century.

References

Businesspeople from Bergen
Danish male writers
Norwegian topographers
Norwegian statisticians
Danish statisticians
1610 births
1680 deaths
17th-century Norwegian writers